Tapinoma heyeri is a species of ant in the genus Tapinoma. Described by Forel in 1902, the species is endemic to Brazil.

References

Tapinoma
Hymenoptera of South America
Insects described in 1902